Stephen Henry Hobhouse (5 August 1881 – 2 April 1961) was a prominent English peace activist, prison reformer, and religious writer.

Family 
Stephen Henry Hobhouse was born in Pitcombe, Somerset, England. He was the eldest son of Henry Hobhouse (1854–1937), a wealthy landowner and Liberal MP from 1885 to 1906, and Margaret Heyworth Potter. Both sides of his family included a number of reformers and progressive politicians:
 As an MP, his father was behind the Education Act of 1902.
 His paternal cousin Emily Hobhouse (1860–1926) was known for bringing attention to British concentration camps in South Africa during the Second Boer War. Her views greatly influenced Stephen.
 His paternal cousin Leonard Trelawny Hobhouse (1864–1929) was a sociologist and one of the founders of social liberalism.
 His brother Sir Arthur Lawrence Hobhouse (1886–1965) was the architect of the system of National parks of England and Wales.
 His maternal aunt Catherine Courtney, Baroness Courtney of Penwith (1847-1929), was a social worker and internationalist.
 His maternal aunt Beatrice Webb, Baroness Passfield (1858–1943), was a sociologist, economist, and social reformer who played key roles in founding both the London School of Economics and Political Science and the Fabian Society.
 His maternal grandfather Richard Potter (1817–1892) was a chairman of the Great Western Railway.
 His maternal great-grandfather Richard Potter (1778–1842) was a radical Liberal Party MP.

Education and formative years 

Stephen Hobhouse was brought up as a member of the established Church of England. He was educated at Eton, where he won prizes in both academics and sports, and at Balliol College, Oxford. Hobhouse attended Quaker meetings in Hampstead after graduation and officially became a member of the Society of Friends in 1909.

The Second Boer War broke out when he was 18. He originally supported the war but his views were soon challenged by his cousin Emily. "Thus, no doubt, it was that my mind was prepared for the awakening". What he regarded as an awakening came from a 1902 reading of a pamphlet by Leo Tolstoy. This tract had a profound influence on him and he became an ardent lifelong pacifist.

He worked as a civil servant for seven years in the Board of Education. During the Balkan Wars of 1912–1913, he resigned his post to go to Constantinople as a volunteer with a Quaker relief mission that helped refugees and saw firsthand the damage that war can do.

Marriage 

In April 1915, Hobhouse married Rosa Waugh (1882–1971).  He met her at a dinner party for Christian activists. She was also an activist, and spent three months in jail for distributing pacifist pamphlets.  Rosa was also a prolific author on her own. Together they wrote a biography of Samuel Hahnemann, the founder of homeopathy. Both Hobhouses were firm believers in homeopathy, and Steven even translated articles for the Homeopathic Journal.

As eldest son of a wealthy family, Stephen stood to inherit a large fortune, but, influenced by Tolstoy again, he renounced his inheritance. He and his wife adopted a lifestyle of poverty, living in Hoxton, then a slum district in East London. At the same time they joined the Quakers and became active in Quaker service.

Pacifism and prison 
Hobhouse was conscripted into the army in 1916.

At a tribunal in August 1916, he was granted an exemption from military service so long as he joined the Friends Ambulance Unit. As an absolutist or unconditionalist conscientious objector, however, Hobhouse refused either to accept the decision or to appeal against it. He ignored a notice to report to barracks, was arrested by the civil police, brought before a magistrates' court, and handed over to the military. He refused to put on military uniform, was court-martialled and sentenced to imprisonment with hard labour.

Hobhouse was then placed in solitary confinement because he refused to obey the "Rule of Silence" forbidding prisoners to speak to one another.  He wrote to his wife: "The spirit of love requires that I should speak to my fellow-prisoners, the spirit of truth that I should speak to them openly" By mid-1917, after 112 days in jail, followed by a second jail sentence, his health was declining rapidly. (His health had always been frail: he had previously suffered nervous breakdowns and scarlet fever.) His wife was very angry about his treatment in prison and some said that he never recovered his health entirely. In 1917 Hobhouse wrote:

Nearly every feature of prison life seems deliberately arranged to destroy a man's sense of his own personality, his power of choice and initiative, his possessive instincts, his concept of himself as a being designed to love and serve his fellow-man. His very name is blotted out and he becomes a number; A.3.21 and D.2.65 were two of my designations. He and his fellows are elaborately counted, when-ever moved from one location to another, in the characteristic machine-like way. He is continually, of course, under lock and key, ignored except as an object for spying.

His mother, Margaret, was a supporter of the First World War, in which three of her four sons served: the youngest Paul Edward was killed in March 1918. She was determined, however, to save her eldest son Stephen's life and to draw attention to the predicament of 1,350 war resisters then being held in prison.

She maintained that "absolutists" like Stephen should either receive a King's Pardon or be released into civilian life. Margaret produced a pamphlet, I Appeal unto Caesar: the case of the conscientious objectors, with an introduction by the eminent classicist and public figure Gilbert Murray, publicising the plight of the conscientious objectors. The pamphlet sold over 18,000 copies. (Recent research by Jo Vellacott has revealed that the appeal's author was actually Bertrand Russell.) This active public campaign was aided discreetly by the influential Alfred Milner, who was a family friend. The case of Stephen Hobhouse was first raised in Parliament on 9 July 1917. The campaign eventually prevailed, and in December 1917 Stephen, and some 300 other COs, was released from prison on grounds of ill health.

In prison Hobhouse met Fenner Brockway, a "fiery socialist" and fellow anti-war activist. After the war, they wrote English Prisons Today, sponsored by the Prison System Enquiry Committee. This book, which appeared in 1922, was a critique of the entire English prison system, initiating a wave of prison reform which has continued to this day.

Writings 
Hobhouse wrote many books on prison reform, Quakerism, and religion. Selected works include:
 1918 
 1919 
 1919 
 1922 
 1927 
 1934 
 1937 
 1948 
 1944? 
 1946 
 1951 
 1952 
 1954

References 
Notes

Sources
 Brock, Peter, These strange criminals : an anthology of prison memoirs by conscientious objectors to military service from the Great War to the Cold War, Toronto: University of Toronto Press, 2004, 
 Hobhouse, Rosa Waugh, Life of Christian Samuel Hahnemann, founder of homeopathy, New Delhi: B. Jain, 2001, 
 Hochschild, Adam, To end all wars : a story of loyalty and rebellion, 1914-1918, Boston: Houghton Mifflin Harcourt, 2011, 
 Moorehead, Caroline, Bertrand Russell: a life, New York: Viking, 1993, 
 Rae, John, Conscience and Politics - The British Government and the Conscientious Objector to Military Service 1916-1919, Oxford University Press, 1970, 
 Vellacott, Jo, Bertrand Russell and the pacifists in the First World War, New York: St. Martin's Press, 1981, 
 Wills, David W, Stephen Henry Hobhouse: a twentieth-century Quaker saint, London, Friends Home Service Committee, 1972
 Zedner, Lucia, The criminological foundations of penal policy: essays in honour of Roger Hood, Oxford: Oxford University Press, 2003,

External links
 
 Full text of English prisons to-day; being the report of the Prison System Enquiry Committee, digitized by the Internet Archive
 Full text of I appeal unto Cæsar: the case of the conscientious objector, (fourth edition) digitized by the Internet Archive
 Hobhouse, Mrs. Henry, I Appeal Unto Caesar, London: Allen & Unwin, 1917

1881 births
1961 deaths
Military personnel from Somerset
British Army personnel of World War I
British Army soldiers
Alumni of Balliol College, Oxford
Anglican pacifists
Classical liberalism
Converts to Quakerism
English Christian pacifists
English conscientious objectors
English male non-fiction writers
English Quakers
English religious writers
Stephen
Non-interventionism
People educated at Eton College
People from Somerset
Prison reformers